Sascha Paeth (born 9 September 1970 in Wolfsburg, West Germany) is a German guitarist, bassist, musical producer, and mixer known for working with heavy metal bands such as Avantasia, Edguy, Angra, Shaaman, Rhapsody of Fire, Kamelot, After Forever and Epica. He owns the "Gate Studios", Wolfsburg previously used for recordings with his former band Heavens Gate.

Sascha Paeth has produced many albums along with Miro. In 2004, he produced Aina, a metal opera featuring a number of guests. In 2007, Paeth and Miro also helped to rebuild Tobias Sammet's metal opera Avantasia, producing the albums of The Wicked Trilogy (with Paeth being the main guitarist). He also assisted Sammet with putting together a band, enabling Avantasia to tour.

Credits

References

External links 
 Interview

1970 births
German heavy metal guitarists
German male guitarists
German heavy metal singers
Heavy metal producers
Living people
People from Wolfsburg
Luca Turilli (band) members
Luca Turilli's Dreamquest members
21st-century German  male singers
21st-century guitarists